Steven Bernstein (born October 8, 1961) is an American trumpeter, slide trumpeter, arranger/composer and bandleader from New York City.  He is best known for his work in The Lounge Lizards, Sex Mob, Spanish Fly and the Millennial Territory Orchestra. Sex Mob's 2006 CD Sexotica was nominated for a Grammy.

Bernstein has been the musical director for the Kansas City Band (from Robert Altman's film Kansas City), Jim Thirlwell's Steroid Maximus and Hal Wilner's Leonard Cohen, Doc Pomus and Bill Withers projects. Bernstein has released four albums under his own name on John Zorn's Tzadik Records: Diaspora Soul, Diaspora Blues, Diaspora Hollywood and Diaspora Suite. He has performed with jazz giants including Roswell Rudd, Sam Rivers, Don Byron and Medeski, Martin & Wood, as well as musicians ranging from Aretha Franklin to Lou Reed, from Linda Ronstadt to Digable Planets, from Sting to Courtney Love. Since 2004 Bernstein has been a member of Levon Helm's Midnight Ramble band, playing in Helm's Woodstock home, as well as touring with the band. As an arranger Bernstein has written for Bill Frisell, Rufus Wainright, Marianne Faithfull and Elton John among others. He has composed for dance, theatre, film and television, and with composer John Lurie, arranged the scores to many feature films, including Get Shorty.

Bernstein is perhaps best known for playing the slide trumpet. As he indicated an interview with PostGenre, "with the slide trumpet, you have complete freedom. There’s not really anyone to compare your sound to. And that lack of comparisons gave me the freedom to not worry much about what other people did before me."

Discography

Solo/collaborations
Diaspora Soul (1999), Tzadik
Diaspora Blues (2002), Tzadik
Diaspora Hollywood (2004), Tzadik
Diaspora Suite (2008), Tzadik
Baby Loves Jazz: Go Baby Go! (2006) Verve
Tattoos and Mushrooms (2010), ILK Music - with Marcus Rojas and Kresten Osgood
Viper's Drag (2014), Impulse - with Henry Butler

Sexmob (Sex Mob)
Din of Inequity (1998,) Columbia/Knitting Factory
Solid Sender (2000), Knitting Factory/Rex
Theatre & Dance (2000)
Sex Mob Does Bond (2001), Atlantic/Ropeadope
Dime Grind Palace(2003), Ropeadope
Sexotica (2006), Thirsty Ear
Sex Mob Meets Medeski/Live in Willisau (2009), Thirsty Ear
Sexmob Plays Fellini (2013), Royal Potato Family
Cultural Capital (2017), Rex

Steven Bernstein's Millennial Territory Orchestra
MTO Volume 1 (2006), ADA Global
We Are MTO (2008), Mowo Inc
MTO Plays Sly (2011), Royal Potato Family
Tinctures in Time (Community Music, Vol. 1) (2021), Royal Potato Family

With Nels Cline
Lovers (Blue Note, 2016)
With Mario Pavone
Mythos (Playscape, 2002)
Orange (Playscape, 2003)
Deez to Blues (Playscape, 2006)

TV appearances
 SOLOS: the jazz sessions (Bravo! Canada - 2005)

References

External links

Sex Mob and Way Beyond..., interview with Steven Bernstein in www.theglobaldispatches.com

Post-bop trumpeters
Jazz fusion trumpeters
American jazz trumpeters
American male trumpeters
Tzadik Records artists
1961 births
Living people
Musicians from New York City
Avant-garde jazz trumpeters
Jazz musicians from New York (state)
21st-century trumpeters
21st-century American male musicians
American male jazz musicians
The Lounge Lizards members
Sexmob members
Spanish Fly (band) members
The Coalition of the Willing (band) members
Ilk Records artists
Impulse! Records artists